Judy Clark (born 1949) is a British artist. She works in many media, including painting, photography, performance, sculptural media, and print processes.

She studied at Portsmouth Polytechnic and the Slade School of Art. During the 1980s she worked in a studio in Carpenters Road in Stratford. 
Her work is in the permanent collection of the Tate Gallery.

Early work 
After exhibiting her post-graduate work at Slade, she was approached by the curators of the newly opened Garage Art gallery in London. She was invited to exhibit more of her work, and created the solo exhibition 'Issues' for November 1979. Clark was inspired by Mary Douglas anthropology work on taboos and disorder, published in Purity and Danger.  Clark cited from the book throughout the exhibition. She was also inspired by travel in Europe, where she saw the contemporary work of Joseph Beuys, Dieter Rot, and others. Clark also cited a TV programme exploring fictional investigations of forensic science teams as an influence. 'Issues' explores the body through Clark's collection of bodily fluids and parts, such as menstruation and hair. Clark was one of the first artists to explore menstrual blood in her art. The exhibition received an unusual amount of attention for an artist who was young and just done with art school. 'Issues' was reviewed in mainstream media by Caroline Tisdall in The Guardian and Marina Valzey in Financial Times.

Later work 
In 1990, Clark was commissioned to design a series of acoustic wall hangings' for Portcullis House, Westminster.

In 1990, Clark won an Arts Council Grant for the project 'A Rare Sighting' with Cable Street Gallery, London.

Clark was awarded a major award from Arts Council to develop her artistic practice from 2000 to 2017.

Solo exhibitions 

 Solo exhibition, 'The Occupier,' Pallant House Gallery, Chichester, 1998
 Solo exhibition, 'Issues', Garage Art, Earlham Street, London, November–December 1973

Further reading 
Judy Clark's work has been explored by several art writers, critics, and art historians:

 Kathy Battista, Renegotiating the Body: Feminist Art in 1970s London, I.B. Tauris, 2013.
 Alicia Foster, Tate Women Artists, Tate Publishing, 2004. 
 Ricard Cork, Everything Seemed Possible, Yale University Press, 2003
 Griselda Pollock and Rozsika Parker, Framing Feminism, Pandora, 1985

References

British artists
1949 births
Living people
Place of birth missing (living people)